Ølstykke-Stenløse is a city located in the Egedal Municipality, in the Capital Region of Denmark. Both Ølstykke and Stenløse has been counted as one city by Statistics Denmark from 1 January 2010, and it forms the eastern part of the city closest to Copenhagen, 25 kilometers in a straight line northwest of City Hall Square, as well as Gammel Ølstykke and Ølstykke Stationsby in the west. It is Denmark's 30th largest city (2015), with a population of 22,658 (2022), and the largest city in Egedal Municipality.

Notable people 
 Lars Hendriksen (born 1966 in Ølstykke) a Danish sailor, competed at the 1992 Summer Olympics
 Tine Scheuer-Larsen (born 1966 in Ølstykke) a retired female tennis player
 Mark Gundelach (born 1992 in Stenløse) a Danish football midfielder, who plays for FC Roskilde
 Nicklas Strunck (born 1999 in Stenløse) a Danish footballer who plays for FC Groningen

References

Cities and towns in the Capital Region of Denmark
Populated places established in 2010
2010 establishments in Denmark
Egedal Municipality